Raphael Rutman (Modern Hebrew: רפאל ראטמאן, born November 18, 1972) — is a Chabad Light Rabbi and a Shliach ("emissary") of the Lubavitcher Rebbe Menachem Mendel Schneerson.

Biography 
He received his secondary education in the United Kingdom. Received a bachelor's degree in "Higher Jewish Education" in the United States. Became an envoy of the Lubavitcher Rebbe in Ukraine in 1993. Opened many children's social programs in Ukraine. Also, with his direct participation, the first Jewish orphanages for orphans in Ukraine were opened. Subsequently, he opened Jewish orphanages in many cities of Ukraine. On the initiative of Rutman, winter and summer Jewish children's camps began their work. Created children's educational and entertainment clubs throughout the CIS.

He opened and manages two schools, primary and secondary in Kyiv, as well as a junior rabbinical college. Leads the international Jewish community for diplomats and local and foreign businessmen in Kyiv. He is the Executive Vice Chairman of the Council of the Federation of Jewish Communities of Ukraine, an organization that includes all the rabbis of Ukraine. Responsible for all diplomatic and international relations of the Federation of Jewish Communities of Ukraine.

Married, wife Devorah was born in Miami, has 7 children.

Activity 
11 October 2021 President of the European Council Charles Michel lit a candle near the Menorah monument and, Vice Chairman of the Board of the Federation of Jewish Communities of Ukraine, prayed in memory of those killed in the Babyn Yar tragedy in a symbolic synagogue.

In January 2022 had a prayer at International symposium dedicated to the Babyn Yar massacre and Eastern European Holocaust ahead of Holocaust Remembrance Day to be held in Kyiv.

In April 2022, was in Kyiv before the start of Pesach and was interviewed by CNN’s Jake Tapper. He gave him items for a full Seder and put on Teffilin.

Literature 
 Sarah Garibov. Memories for a Blessing Jewish Mourning Rituals and Commemorative Practices in Postwar Belarus and Ukraine, 1944-1991. University of Michigan, 2017.

References

External links 
 Biography
 Heavyweight Champ Vitali Klitschko Removes Gloves For Menorah Lighting

Living people
20th-century Ukrainian rabbis
21st-century Ukrainian rabbis
Chabad-Lubavitch emissaries
Jewish messianism
Chabad-Lubavitch Hasidim
Rabbis of Chabad
Rabbis of Lubavitch
People from London
Ukrainian Orthodox rabbis
1972 births